Tutti a casa is the tenth studio album by the Italian rapper Bassi Maestro, released on 20 December 2011 under Sano Business.

Track listing

Link 

2011 albums
Bassi Maestro albums